Mary Ames may refer to:

 Mary C. Ames (1839–1884), American journalist, author, and poet
 Mary Francis Ames (1853–1929), children's book author and illustrator
 Mary E. Pulsifer Ames, American botanist